Istituto Elvetico Salesiani Don Bosco is an Italian international school, in Lugano, Switzerland. It serves elementary school through liceo (: senior high school).

Accreditation
IESDB's (upper) secondary education (Middle and High School) is not approved as a Mittelschule/Collège/Liceo by the Swiss Federal State Secretariat for Education, Research and Innovation (SERI).

References

External links
 Istituto Elvetico Salesiani Don Bosco 

Italian international schools in Switzerland
Lugano
Schools in the canton of Ticino